Rozee.pk (lit: "Livelihood") is a Pakistani employment website which is a subsidiary of Naseeb Networks. It was founded in 2007 by Monis Rahman.

History
In 2011, AllWorld Network listed the company as one of Pakistan's fastest growing private companies.

Rozee.pk bought Saudi employment website Mihnati.com for an undisclosed amount in 2013.

In 2016, the website went into complete reconstruction changing its interface, algorithms and logo.

See also 
 List of employment websites

References

External links
 

Employment websites
Online companies of Pakistan
Business services companies established in 2007
Internet properties established in 2007
Companies based in Lahore
Pakistani websites
Pakistani subsidiaries of foreign companies